Alebrijes de Oaxaca Fútbol Club is a Mexican football team based in the city of Oaxaca, state of Oaxaca. They play in the second tier of Mexican football league, Liga de Expansión MX. The team was created when the Tecamachalco franchise won the Segunda División title and earned the promotion to the Ascenso MX. Due to poor infrastructure they were unable to participate, which led to the formation of the new Oaxaca franchise.

History
In the team's search for a new venue, the owners of the Tecamachalco franchise received support from the Oaxacan state government. They also received support from a group of businessmen led by Carlos Ojeda of Laredo, who wanted to bring professional football back to the state of Oaxaca.

On December 10, 2012, the president of the Liga MX, Ascenso MX, and Decio de María made the official announcement at the state capital building of the start of a new football club.
The name of the club was changed to "Alebrijes" following a vote by the public. The new name refers to the colorful folk sculptures made in the state.

On July 20, 2013, they played their first Ascenso MX game, drawing 2–2 with Atlético San Luis. On April 9, 2014, Alebrijes lost the Clausura 2014 Copa MX finals against Tigres UANL by 3–0 at the Estadio Universitario.

On December 2, 2017, Oaxaca defeated FC Juárez on penalties to win the Apertura 2017 Ascenso MX tournament.

On May 28, 2019, Oaxaca had an administrative change, and the franchise belonging to Grupo Tecamachalco was paused for a year so that its owners could find a new city and remodel the administration of the club. Meanwhile, the franchise belonging to Zacatepec Siglo XXI (on hiatus between 2017 and 2019) was transferred to Oaxaca to ensure the continuity of Alebrijes in Ascenso MX. In the first tournament with the new board, the team won the championship by defeating Atlético Zacatepec with an aggregate score of 5–3, with this, the team won the second league title in its history, also being the last trophy awarded in the history of Ascenso MX.

Stadium

Alebrijes de Oaxaca play their home matches at the Estadio Tecnológico de Oaxaca in Oaxaca City, Oaxaca. The stadium capacity is 14,950 people. Its surface is covered by natural grass.

Personnel

Coaching staff

Players

First-team squad

Reserve teams
Alebrijes de Oaxaca Premier
Reserve team that plays in the Liga Premier in the third level of the Mexican league system.

Alebrijes Teotihuacán
Reserve team that plays in the Liga TDP, the fourth level of the Mexican league system.

Managers
 Ricardo Rayas (2013–15)
 Marco Antonio Trejo (Interim) (2015)
 Flavio Davino (2015–2016)
 Mario García Covalles (2016)
 Irving Rubirosa (2016–2018)
 Ricardo Rayas (2018–2019)
 Alex Diego (2019)
 Alejandro Pérez (2019–2020)
 Oscar Fernando Torres (2020–2021)
 Jorge Manrique (Interim) (2021)

Honours
 Ascenso MX

 Winners (2): Apertura 2017, Apertura 2019
 Copa MX
 Runners-Up (1): Clausura 2014

Goal Scoring Champions

Notable players

 Diego Menghi
 Gustavo Ramírez
 Giancarlo Maldonado
 Luis Madrigal
 Sergio Arias
 Alberto Medina
 Édgar Hernández
 Lucero Álvarez

References

Football clubs in Oaxaca
Ascenso MX teams
Association football clubs established in 2012
2012 establishments in Mexico